The Wesley Chapel Methodist Episcopal Church in Eldersburg, Maryland is a characteristic small church of the period (built ~1822), with uncoursed stone rubble construction and a simple plan. The interior is a single barrel-vaulted room. It was erected to serve one of the earliest Methodist congregations in Carroll County, and hence in the United States, as Carroll County was a birthplace of Methodism in America.

It was listed on the National Register of Historic Places in 1984.

References

External links

, including photo in 2006, at Maryland Historical Trust

Eldersburg, Maryland
Churches on the National Register of Historic Places in Maryland
Churches completed in 1821
Churches in Carroll County, Maryland
Methodist churches in Maryland
History of Methodism in the United States
National Register of Historic Places in Carroll County, Maryland
Methodist Episcopal churches in the United States